Marques Rebelo, pseudonym of Edy Dias da Cruz (6 January 1907 — 26 August 1973), was a Brazilian writer associated to the Modernist movement.

Life
Edy Dias da Cruz was born in Rio de Janeiro, in 1907. He spent his childhood in Barbacena, in the state of Minas Gerais. There he studied and became an avid reader. He returned to Rio in 1918, to finish his secondary education. He later studied Medicine but did not finish the course, later working as a salesman.

Adopting the pen name Marques Rebelo, he started submitting poems and short stories for magazines. In 1931 he published his first book, Oscarina, a short story collection. The book was praised by the critics at the time. Rebelo worked for several newspapers and magazines and wrote a number of books, among them novels, short stories, and children's books. Despite being associated to the Brazilian Modernism, Rebelo's urban prose and social commentary owes much to writers like Manuel Antonio de Almeida (of whom Rebelo wrote a biography), Lima Barreto and Machado de Assis.

In 1965, Rebelo was nominated to the Brazilian Academy of Letters.

Rebelo died on 26 August 1973.

Selceted works 

 Oscarina, 1931
 Três caminhos, 1933
 Marafa, 1935
 A estrela sobe, 1939
 Stela me abriu a porta, 1942
 Vida e obra de Manuel Antônio de Almeida, 1943
 Cenas da vida brasileira, 1943
 Bibliografia de Manuel Antônio de Almeida, 1951
 Cortina de ferro, 1956
 Correio europeu, 1959
 O Trapicheiro, 1959
 A mudança, 1962
 O simples Coronel Madureira, 1967
 Antologia Escolar Brasileira, 1967
 Brasil, Terra & Alma: Guanabara, 1967
 A Guerra está entre nós, 1968
 Antologia Escolar Portuguesa, 1970

References

1907 births
1973 deaths
20th-century Brazilian male writers
20th-century Brazilian novelists
20th-century Brazilian short story writers
Writers from Rio de Janeiro (city)
Brazilian male novelists
Brazilian male short story writers